The 1980–81 Yugoslav Cup; also known as "Marshal Tito Cup" (Kup Maršala Tita); was the 33rd season of the top association football knockout competition in Yugoslavia since its establishment in 1946.

The defending 1979–80 cup winners Dinamo Zagreb failed to retain the trophy as they were knocked out in the second round (i.e. round of 16) by Radnički Niš. Herzegovina side Velež from Mostar and Bosnian side Željezničar from Sarajevo reached the tournament final, in what would become the only cup final contested by two clubs from SR Bosnia and Herzegovina in the history of the competition which ran from 1946 to 1992.

In the final match, played at the neutral ground of Red Star Stadium in Belgrade, Velež, led by coach Miloš Milutinović, won the cup by beating Ivica Osim's Željezničar 3–2 with Vahid Halilhodžić scoring a brace and Dragan Okuka adding a decisive third goal in the 80th minute. This was Velež's first cup win in only their second appearance in the final, the first one taking place 23 years earlier in 1957–58.

Surprise of the tournament were third level sides Bregalnica Štip and Orijent (hailing from SR Macedonia and SR Croatia respectively) who sensationally managed to reach the quarter-finals. Bregalnica were eventually knocked out by cup winners Velež, while Orijent lost their quarter-final tie on penalties after holding the Montenegrin side Budućnost Titograd to a goalless draw. Budućnost themselves had an unusually good run, reaching the semi-finals and eliminating two of the Yugoslav "Big Four" clubs in the process, Hajduk Split and Red Star.

Calendar
The Yugoslav Cup was a tournament for which clubs from all tiers of the football pyramid were eligible to enter. In addition, amateur teams put together by individual Yugoslav People's Army garrisons and various factories and industrial plants were also encouraged to enter, which meant that each cup edition could have several thousands of teams in its preliminary stages. These teams would play through a number of qualifying rounds before reaching the first round proper, in which they would be paired with top-flight teams.

The cup final was played on Sunday, 24 May, traditionally scheduled to coincide with Youth Day celebrated on 25 May, a national holiday in Yugoslavia which also doubled as the official commemoration of Josip Broz Tito's birthday.

First round
First round proper was played on 15 October 1980. As in all stages until the final, ties were decided over a single leg, with penalty shootouts used to determine winners when matches ended in a draw after regular time. All eighteen 1980–81 Yugoslav First League clubs entered the competition at this stage, along with fourteen lower-tier teams.

Seven top-level clubs were knocked out at this stage: Borac Banja Luka, Hajduk Split, Rijeka, Sarajevo, Vardar, Vojvodina, and NK Zagreb.

In the following tables winning teams are marked in bold; teams from outside top level are marked in italic script.

Second round
Second round proper was played on 19 November 1980. This round was marked by cup holders Dinamo Zagreb's exit following their 2–1 defeat to Radnički Niš, and the two third level minnows Bregalnica and Orijent who both knocked out top flight opponents. The tie between Sutjeska and Velež was awarded 3–0 to Velež.

Quarter-finals
Quarter-final matches were played on 22 February 1981.

Semi-finals
Semi-final matches were played on 1 April 1981.

Final

See also
1980–81 Yugoslav First League
1980–81 Yugoslav Second League

External links
1980–81 cup season details at Rec.Sport.Soccer Statistics Foundation
1981 cup final details at Rec.Sport.Soccer Statistics Foundation

Yugoslav Cup seasons
Cup
Yugo